Grant Randall Gibbs (born July 22, 1989) is an American basketball coach and former player. Standing at 196 cm (6 ft 5 in), Gibbs used to play as shooting guard or small forward.

Professional career

Landstede Zwolle (2014–2016) 
In the 2015–16 season, while playing for Landstede Zwolle, Gibbs was named the DBL Most Improved Player and was awarded a spot in the All-DBL Team.

Oettinger Rockets (2016–2017) 
In August 2016, Gibbs signed with Oettinger Rockets of the German second division ProA.

Coaching career

Oklahoma City Blue (2017–2022) 
In October 2017, Gibbs signed as an assistant coach with the Oklahoma City Blue of the NBA G League. On August 2, 2019, he was promoted to the position of head coach for the Blue after former coach Mark Daigneault accepted an assistant coach position on the Oklahoma City Thunder, the NBA affiliate of the Blue.

Oklahoma City Thunder (2022-present) 
On September 23, 2022, the Thunder announced Gibbs will join the Thunder coaching staff after serving as head coach of the Oklahoma City Blue for the past three seasons. Gibbs became the third Blue head coach to join the Thunder coaching staff.

References

External links
Creighton Bluejays bio

1989 births
Living people
American expatriate basketball people in Germany
American expatriate basketball people in the Netherlands
American men's basketball players
Basketball coaches from Iowa
Basketball players from Iowa
Creighton Bluejays men's basketball players
Dutch Basketball League players
Gonzaga Bulldogs men's basketball players
Landstede Hammers players
Linn-Mar High School alumni
Oklahoma City Blue coaches
People from Marion, Iowa
Rockets (basketball club) players
Shooting guards
Small forwards